The Folk Implosion is an EP by American indie rock band The Folk Implosion. It was released in 1996 on the Communion Label.

Track listing

Personnel
Lou Barlow - bass guitar, drums, vocals
John Davis - guitar, drums, vocals

References

1994 EPs
The Folk Implosion albums